Göfis is a municipality in the district of Feldkirch in the Austrian state of Vorarlberg.

Population

References

 08.01.2021 – Am 1.1.2021 betrug die Einwohnzahl 3.556

Bregenz Forest Mountains
Cities and towns in Feldkirch District